Limnonectes macrognathus is a species of frog in the family Dicroglossidae. It is found in Malaysia, Myanmar and Thailand.
Its natural habitats are subtropical or tropical moist lowland forests, rivers and intermittent rivers.
Its status is insufficiently known.

References

External links
Amphibian and Reptiles of Peninsular Malaysia - Limnonectes macrognathus

macrognathus
Amphibians described in 1917
Taxonomy articles created by Polbot